A by-election for the seat of Canterbury in the New South Wales Legislative Assembly was held on 16 September 1885 because Henry Moses was appointed to the Legislative Council.

Dates

Results

Henry Moses was appointed to the Legislative Council.

See also
Electoral results for the district of Canterbury
List of New South Wales state by-elections

References

Canterbury
New South Wales state by-elections
1880s in New South Wales